The Avenue Hoche is an avenue in the 8th arrondissement of Paris, France.

Location
The avenue runs the intersection at 67, Rue de Courcelles and the Place du Général-Brocard all the way to the Place Charles de Gaulle and its Arc de Triomphe, in the 8th arrondissement of Paris.

History
The avenue was built as a private road in 1822. It was later renamed in honour of General Lazare Hoche. French royalist and general Athanase-Charles-Marie Charette de la Contrie lived here after the royal family was removed from the Palace of Versailles.

References

8th arrondissement of Paris
Avenues (landscape) in Paris